Amblychaeta is a genus of flies in the family Tachinidae.

Species
Amblychaeta picticornis Aldrich, 1934

Distribution
Argentina

References

Exoristinae
Tachinidae genera
Diptera of South America
Taxa named by John Merton Aldrich
Monotypic Brachycera genera